The 46th Annual Daytime Creative Arts Emmy Awards, were presented by the National Academy of Television Arts and Sciences (NATAS), honoring the best in US daytime television programming in 2018. The winners were announced in a ceremony at Pasadena Civic Auditorium in Pasadena, California on May 3, 2019, two days prior the main awards ceremony.

The nominations for both the main ceremony categories and the creative arts categories were announced on March 20, 2019. French-American chef and television personality Jacques Pépin received the Lifetime Achievement Award.

Winners and nominees

The winners are listed first, in boldface.

Lifetime Achievement Award
 Jacques Pépin

Programming

Performance and Hosting

Animation

Art Direction

Casting

Cinematography

Costume Design

Directing

Editing

Hairstyling

Lighting Direction

Main Title Design

Makeup

Music

Technical Direction

Sound

Writing

References

External links
 Daytime Emmys website

046 Creative Arts
2019 television awards
2019 in American television